Delwar Hossain (born 1 January 1985) is a first-class and List A cricketer from Bangladesh.  He made his debut for Rajshahi Division in 2006/07.  He scored an unbeaten 51 on his first-class debut against Barisal Division and got figures of 3–46 in the one day clash against Dhaka Division.

He was the joint-leading wicket-taker for Prime Bank Cricket Club in the 2017–18 Dhaka Premier Division Cricket League, with 17 dismissals in 8 matches. He was also the leading wicket-taker for Shinepukur Cricket Club in the 2018–19 Dhaka Premier Division Cricket League tournament, with 19 dismissals in 10 matches. In November 2019, he was selected to play for the Sylhet Thunder in the 2019–20 Bangladesh Premier League.

References

1986 births
Living people
Bangladeshi cricketers
Rajshahi Division cricketers
People from Rajshahi District
Gazi Group cricketers
Mohammedan Sporting Club cricketers
Prime Doleshwar Sporting Club cricketers
Prime Bank Cricket Club cricketers
Bangladesh North Zone cricketers
Shinepukur Cricket Club cricketers